Vladimir Belov (born 6 August 1984) is a Russian chess grandmaster. He competed in the FIDE World Cup 2007 reaching round 2.

Tournament victories include the 2004/05 Hastings International Chess Congress, the North Sea Cup in 2005, the Master Open of the Biel Chess Festival and the Chigorin Memorial in 2008. Belov was champion of Moscow in 2007.

He is also a chess trainer. Among his trainees are Aleksandra Goryachkina and Nazí Paikidze.

References

External links
 
 
 
 
 Vladimir Belov chess games at 365Chess.com

1984 births
Living people
Chess grandmasters
Russian chess players
People from Kirzhachsky District
Chess coaches